Tavşancık can refer to the following villages in Turkey:

 Tavşancık, Horasan
 Tavşancık, Kalecik
 Tavşancık, Savaştepe